Schistura psittacula is a species of ray-finned fish, a stone loach in the genus Schistura. It is found in two rivers in central Vietnam where it inhabits riffles in medium-sized mountain rivers and streams in riffles which have a swift current over gravel beds and feeing on aquatic invertebrates.

References

P
Fish described in 2001